Gitwangak Battle Hill National Historic Site, formerly Kitwanga Fort National Historic Site, is a National Historic Site of Canada located near the village of Kitwanga in the Regional District of Kitimat-Stikine in British Columbia, Canada. It protects Battle Hill, a hillfort built by the Gitwangak people in the mid-17th century. The park was developed by George Macdonald, whose archaeological study was of the site, and who was the Director of the National Museum of Civilization until the opening of its current building.

The nearby Gitwangax Village features several wooden totem poles that were originally erected by several 'clans' ('Wilp' in the Gitksan language; 'house' in contemporary use) along the shore of, and facing the Skeena River.  After the flood of ca. 1934, they were moved to higher ground, but (in contrast to traditional practice) to face the village.

History
Battle Hill was a fortress that utilized a strategic location, with a number of different defensive fortifications: rolling things such as rocks and huge logs covered with spikes down the sides of the slopes that surrounded the fortress during raids. This fortress was defended by a legendary chief named (Nehl'xt) he was a warrior that wore a grizzly bear hide for protection which could not be penetrated by any weapons used by the enemy nations attacking. He used a number of weapons most notably a weapon called The One Strike Club to kill his enemy. The Gitwangak people would drop back to this location during raids on the village in the lower part of the Gitwangak territory. This location was never lost during battle. The legends of the battles are recorded and passed on through oral history passed on by the Gitwangak people.

The Gitwangak is one of six communities that belong to the First Nations’ group called the Gitxsan. The word "Git" means "the people," and the word "Xsan" (also spelled 'Ksan) is the ancient word for the nearby Skeena river, which the people thought of as the "river of mist." Therefore, the Gitxsan are the "people of the river of mist."

The Gitxsan have lived in this area for thousands of years. In the late 1700s, a Gitwangak warrior chief named ‘Nekt decided that Battle Hill would make the perfect site for a fortified village. The steep sides would allow the homes on top to be easily protected. ‘Nekt built his clan home here, along with that of two other clans.

‘Nekt was an aggressive warrior and led many successful raids against neighboring tribes to capture slaves, food stores, or ritual regalia. In retaliation, those tribes got together and attacked Battle Hill twice but were unsuccessful.

‘Nekt was eventually killed during one of his raids. He is remembered and celebrated by the Gitxsan people as a powerful and great leader.

Village

Gitwangak or Kitwanga, which means People of the Place of Rabbits, is the most western Gitxsan village on the Skeena River, and is approximately 241 kilometres from the coast. The village itself lies on the northern bank of the Skeena River in northern British Columbia. It is about 3 kilometres from the National Historic Site of Taawdzep or Gitwangak Battle Hill (formerly Kitwanga Fort).

Legend says that the warrior Chief Nekt built the fortified village, which was occupied during the late 18th century and the early 19th century. It was from here that Chief Nekt was able to rule over the much desired oolichan trade routes along the Kitwanga River. The fort was defended by rolling spiked logs down on attackers. As guns grew more accessible the fort was no longer secure, and around 1835, the fort was burned and abandoned. The inhabitants of the fort moved to another village for a brief period of time before moving to the present-day village of Gitwangak.

Following their move from Battle Hill to this village about 1835, members of the Frog-Raven (Ganada), Eagle (Laxskik) and Wolf (Laxgibu) clans commemorated their history in a series of carved house poles. The monuments in the present-day village were erected between 1840 and 1942, and each pertains directly to the families who once lived at Gitwangak Battle Hill. The Fireweed (Gisgast) clan joined the village later. Totem poles continued to be erected at potlatches in this village in spite of federal anti-potlatch laws, from 1874 to 1954. Although the remaining poles have been moved several times to protect them from floods, they represent the oldest collection to be found in their original village context anywhere in British Columbia.

Textual information for this page: Barbeau, 1929; G.F. MacDonald, 1984; J. MacDonald, 1984; Miller & Eastman, 1984; Parks Canada Website; Seguin, 1984.

See also
List of national historic sites of Canada

References

BCGNIS listing "Kitwanga Fort National Historic Site

External links
 Gitwangak Battle Hill National Historic Site - Parks Canada

Heritage sites in British Columbia
Gitxsan
Skeena Country
National Historic Sites in British Columbia